Ryan Edward Watkins (born 9 June 1983) is a Welsh cricketer. He played for Glamorgan as a left-handed batsman and a right-arm medium-pace bowler.

As a teenager, he captained Gwent and Wales before signing a development contract with the Welsh County side.

Watkins made his debut in 2005 and contributed with both the bat and the ball during 2006, when he was consistently in the first XI.

Watkins also holds the record by a Glamorgan outfielder for holding the most catches in a match: he caught seven in a County Championship match against Kent County Cricket Club..

In 2009 he set a new Glamorgan record for Twenty20 cricket bowling with 5/16 against Gloucestershire, but was released by the side after the 2009 season.

References

1983 births
Living people
Cricketers from Abergavenny
Glamorgan cricketers
Wales National County cricketers
Welsh cricketers
Wiltshire cricketers